Vojtěch Přeučil (born 19 September 1990) is a Czech football player who currently plays for ASV Schrems in Austria.

Career

Club career
In January 2020, Přeučil moved to Austrian club, ASV Schrems.

Career statistics

References

External links
 
 Guardian Football

1990 births
Living people
Czech footballers
Czech expatriate footballers
Czech National Football League players
Czech First League players
FK Dukla Prague players
FC Silon Táborsko players
FC Vysočina Jihlava players
FK Baník Sokolov players
Czech expatriate sportspeople in Austria
Expatriate footballers in Austria
Association football midfielders